Corps colours, or Troop-function colours (ge: "Waffenfarbe(n)") were traditional worn in the German Wehrmacht from 1935 until 1945 as  way to distinguish between several branches, special services, corps, rank groups and appointments of the ministerial area, general staff, Oberkommando der Wehrmacht, up to the military branches Heer, Luftwaffe and Kriegsmarine. The corps colour was part of the piping, uniform gorget, shoulder strap, as well as part of the arabesque and lampasse of any general officer and flag officers. It was also part of heraldic flags, colours, standards and guidons.

Corps colours of the Heer 
In the German Heer there was strictly defined systematic of corps colours on collar patchs, uniform piping and coloured edging around the shoulder boards or shoulder straps. The corps colours of the Reichswehr (1921 until ca. 1935) were almost identically to these of the Wehrmacht.

Synoptic table and examples to military persons in uniform 
The table below contains some corps colours and examples used by the Heer from 1935–45.

 Remark
Corps colours of the Wehrmacht according to the order of the Oberkommandos der Wehrmacht from October 14, 1942, here a selection only.

Corps colours of the Heeresverwaltung 
During World War II, officials of the “Heer/Army administration” (de: Heeresverwaltung, short HV), regardless serving in the Wehrmacht, war economy, or in military education facilities, etc., wore military rank insignias similar to those of the Wehrmacht.

Synoptic table and examples of Heer officials 
Heer officials normally wore, in addition to their dark green main corps colour (de: Haupt-Waffenfarbe), a secondary colour (de: Nebenfarbe) denoting their branch. The Nebenfarbe was worn as piping surrounding the collar Litzen and underneath the shoulder boards on top of the dark green Waffenfarbe. In March 1940 distinct Nebenfarben were abolished and replaced with light grey.
See also
⇒ main article Militärverwaltung (Nazi Germany)

The table below contains some corps colours and examples pertaining to military officials in uniform.

See also
 Waffenfarbe (Waffen-SS)

References

Sources
 Adolf Schlicht, John R. Angolia: Die deutsche Wehrmacht, Uniformierung und Ausrüstung 1933-1945Vol. 1: Das Heer, Motorbuch Verlag, Stuttgart 1992Vol. 3: Die Luftwaffe, Motorbuch Verlag, Stuttgart 1999(very detailed information and discussion but no coloured images)

German military uniforms
Military insignia